Qanat-e Now (also Romanized as Qanāt-e Now; also known as Kalāt Now) is a village in Ganjabad Rural District, Esmaili District, Anbarabad County, Kerman Province, Iran. At the 2006 census, its population was 289, in 52 families.

References 

Populated places in Anbarabad County